Charles Daniel Hanks Jr. (July 21, 1940 – May 10, 2007), better known as Chuck Riley, was an American voice actor. He was famous for recording hundreds of movie trailers, television commercials, network promotions, and children's audiobooks. In his earlier years as a radio DJ, he was known as Chuck Dann and Charlie Tuna.

Life and career 
Charles D. Hanks Jr. was born July 21, 1940, in Kaplan, Louisiana. The first child born to Charles and Irene Hanks, he was nicknamed Danny. In 1952, the family moved to Duncan, Oklahoma where he graduated from high school in 1958. He was soon working at radio station KOMA in Oklahoma City, where he was first known as Chuck Dann, then later as Charlie Tuna. (It was at KOMA that Chuck Riley gave a young Art Ferguson his air name -- Charlie Tuna.)

In 1964 he was on the air as Chuck Dann on CKY in Winnipeg. From there he went to WKYC in Cleveland in 1967, again as Chuck Dann.

By 1972, he had married, had a son and was the dominant afternoon drive jock at WIBC in Indianapolis as Chuck Riley, the name he would use from then on. Riley was also known throughout Indianapolis as the voice of Indy's 1st ever Rock 40 music station Stereo 93 WNAP having recorded the now legendary and iconic "The wrath of The Buzzard" TOH ID.

During his years at WIBC, Riley would often travel to Toronto, Ontario to narrate various radio documentaries for CHUM 1050. He was first hired to be the 1st American imaging voice for the top rated CHUM AM, then in 1969, he narrated a 28 hour radio special titled "1050 CHUM's The history of Rock". Then in 1970, he was back in Toronto narrating "1050 CHUM's The story of The Beatles" a 12 hour history of the group that was also syndicated around the world. And then in 1976 came his biggest CHUM project yet "1050 CHUM's The evolution of Rock", a 64 hour special that took the CHUM listeners from the beginning of Rock 'N' Roll right up to 1976. "The evolution of Rock" won a prestigious Billboard Magazine Award for International Syndicated Special of the Year. The program was later syndicated around the world by TM Productions in Dallas.

In 1979, Riley began a Hollywood voiceover career, moving his family to the San Fernando Valley in Los Angeles. Within a year, he was one of the dominant voices in the industry.

In the 1980s and 90s he did voice work for KMPC, KBIG, and KZLA-KPOL Los Angeles, CKY Winnipeg, KQWB Fargo N.D., WOGL Oldies 98.1 and WIBG Philadelphia, KVIL Dallas/Ft. Worth, WQHT Hot 103 and then Hot 97 New York, WLOL Minneapolis, WAVA Washington D.C., and KPWR Power 106 Los Angeles, KXXX X-100 San Francisco, among others.

In the early 1980s he became the voice of CBS television and Emmis Broadcasting. He went on to perform voice work for thousands of movies for the studios of Warner Bros., Universal, Fox and Paramount.

In 1989, producer Doug Thompson, who'd worked with Chuck at CHUM Toronto moved to Los Angeles and hired Chuck to be the announcer on actor John Candy's weekly two-hour radio series, "Radio Kandy". He also narrated many productions and movies, such as Oliver Stone's Nixon, and CHUM's 1976 documentary The Evolution of Rock, The Killing of America, and Galaxies are Colliding. He narrated hundreds of children's audio books, mainly Disney Read-Alongs, and was an announcer for numerous commercials.

Up to his death, Riley was still recording voiceovers for KABC-TV in Los Angeles.

Death 
Chuck Riley died at age 66 of renal complications on May 10, 2007 in Sherman Oaks, California. He was survived by his five children.

Selected credits
The Godfather - Trailer voiceover
CHUM's 1976 radio documentary The Evolution of Rock - Narrator
E.T. - Trailer voiceover
The Killing of America – Narrator
Die Hard – Trailer voiceover
Child's Play 2 – Trailer voiceover
Trump Card - Announcer
The Hand That Rocks the Cradle – Trailer voiceover
Galaxies Are Colliding – Narrator
Il Postino – Trailer voiceover
Oliver Stone's Nixon - Narrator
Disney's The Hunchback of Notre Dame – Trailer voiceover
Boy Meets World (TV Series) – Voice of the announcer
Columbia TriStar Family Collection - Trailer voiceover
Titanic - Trailer voiceover
Ronin – Trailer voiceover
Oklahoma City Bombing (TV Special) – Narrator
Susan Smith: Nine Days of Deception (TV Special) – Narrator
Disney's Treasure Planet: Disney Read Along – Narrator
Meet The Robinsons – Narrator
Apollo 13: The True Story - Narrator
Hamburger Hill - Trailer voiceover

References

External links 
VoiceHunter.com VO Icons
Chuck Riley obituary from LA Times
Chuck Riley obituary at RadioWest
Chuck Riley obituary at NewYorkFreestyle.com
Chuck Riley obituary at NNTP2HTTP.COM
Chuck Riley obituary at WIBC Indianapolis website
Chuck Riley tribute at reelradio.com
Chuck Riley demo reel at VoiceHunter.com
Chuck Riley aircheck from WIBG Philadelphia
Chuck Riley voiceover of Columbia Tri-Star Family Collection DVD

1940 births
2007 deaths
American male voice actors
Audiobook narrators
Game show announcers
Male actors from Los Angeles
People from Kaplan, Louisiana
People from Sherman Oaks, Los Angeles